Farm to Market Roads in Texas are owned and maintained by the Texas Department of Transportation (TxDOT).

FM 1800

FM 1800/RM 1800 (1951)

The original FM 1800 was designated on December 18, 1951, from FM 307 north to the Martin County line. In September 1952 the road was extended south and southeast to SH 158, 4 miles east of the Midland County line, replacing FM 1857. On December 1, 1953, the route was signed, but not designated, as SH 137. On October 31, 1957, the road was extended southeast  from SH 158. A year later the road was extended southeast  to the Reagan county line. On December 2, 1958, the road was extended southeast via Stiles to RM 33, 12.5 miles north of Big Lake, replacing RM 2404, and FM 1800 was changed to RM 1800. RM 1800 was cancelled on May 16, 1984, as the SH 137 designation became official.

FM 1801

FM 1802

FM 1803

FM 1803 (1951)

The original FM 1803 was designated on November 20, 1951, from US 271, 2 miles north of Tyler, south to SH 64. On December 10, 1954, the road was extended south, west, north and east to FM 1803 0.1 mile south of the point of beginning, replacing FM 845 and completing the loop around Tyler. FM 1803 was cancelled on October 30, 1957, and transferred to Loop 323.

FM 1804

FM 1805

FM 1806

Farm to Market Road 1806 (FM 1806) is a two-lane highway that connects the farming areas of west central Montague County to the county seat, Montague. FM 1806 also intersects with US 81 leading to Ringgold and Bowie, and other various county secondary roads.

The current FM 1806 was designated on December 17, 1952, from US 81 in Stoneburg northeastward and eastward . On November 21, 1956, FM 1806 was extended east . On January 10, 1957, FM 1806 was extended east to SH 59/SH 175, replacing FM 2188. On September 27, 1977, FM 1806 was extended west to its current western terminus.

FM 1806 (1951)

FM 1806 was originally designated on November 20, 1951, on a route from SH 171 to FM 110 (now FM 4) in Johnson County; this route was transferred to FM 916 on December 17, 1952.

FM 1807

FM 1808

FM 1808 (1951)

On December 17, 1952, the road was extended  to SH 101 (now SH 163). FM 1808 was cancelled on February 24, 1953, and transferred to FM 670.

FM 1809

FM 1810

FM 1810 (1951)

The original FM 1810 was designated on November 20, 1951, from US 287, 3.5 miles east of Vernon, northeast to Kingola. FM 1810 was cancelled on October 18, 1954, and became a portion of FM 1763.

FM 1811

FM 1812

FM 1812 (1951)

The original FM 1812 was designated on November 20, 1951, from SH 25 southwest to US 287 in Electra. FM 1812 was cancelled on February 25, 1954, and transferred to SH 25 when it was rerouted. The old route on 5th street, Avenue C, Waggoner Street, Glisson Street, and Main Street was given to the city.

FM 1813

FM 1814

FM 1815

Farm to Market Road 1815 (FM 1815) is located in north central Montague County. The two-lane highway connects FM 1956 with US 82 near Bonita.

FM 1815 was first designated on November 20, 1951, running from US 82 to a point  to the north. It was extended north to its current terminus on November 21, 1956.

FM 1816

Farm to Market Road 1816 (FM 1816) is a two-lane highway in Montague County. FM 1816 also intersects with FM 1806 east of Stoneburg and other various county secondary roads. The road generally parallels US 81 through central Montague County.

FM 1816 was designated on November 20, 1951, from US 82 north . On August 24, 1955, FM 1816 was extended south . On November 21, 1956, FM 1816 was extended south to FM 1806. On February 2, 1959, FM 1816 was extended south to SH 59, replacing FM 1935.

FM 1817

FM 1818

FM 1819

FM 1820
Farm to Market Road 1820 (FM 1820) is a designation that has been used twice. No highway currently uses the FM 1820 designation.

FM 1820 (1951)

The highway was extended  to FM 139 at Pauls Store on August 24, 1955. FM 1820 was cancelled and became a portion of FM 417 on August 13, 1968.

FM 1820 (1978)

The highway was extended  northward to FM 1658 on July 29, 1993. FM 1820 was cancelled on November 19, 1996, with the mileage being transferred to FM 1658.

FM 1821

Farm to Market Road 1821 (FM 1821) is located in Palo Pinto County.

FM 1821 begins at an intersection with FM 1195 near Mineral Wells Airport. The highway starts out running in a west direction along MH 379, then turns north onto Garrett Morris Parkway. FM 1821 travels through more rural areas of Mineral Wells before running near a subdivision and retail center near US 180. The highway leaves the Mineral Wells city limits just north of an intersection with FM 3027 and passes near a subdivision before the route becomes more rural. FM 1821 turns west at Hayes Road and continues to travel in a westward direction, ending at an intersection with US 281.

The current FM 1821 was designated on January 29, 1959, running from US 180 east of Mineral Wells southward and eastward to FM 1195 along a former routing of that highway. On September 27, 1960, the highway was extended northward to US 281 with an overlap with US 180. FM 1821 was routed off of US 180 on November 5, 1971.

Junction list

FM 1821 (1951)

The highway was cancelled on November 28, 1958, with the mileage being transferred to FM 711.

FM 1822

FM 1823

FM 1824

FM 1824 (1951)

FM 1825

Farm to Market Road 1825 (FM 1825) is a  farm to market road located in Travis County. FM 1825 begins in far north Austin at Interstate Highway 35 (I-35) exit 247. It proceeds north and then east  into Pflugerville, within which it is named Pecan Street. FM 1825 ends in Pflugerville at an intersection with FM 685. FM 1825 also includes a short  unsigned spur along Vision Drive that acts as a bypass for the north/south section running parallel to I-35.

As designated on November 20, 1951, FM 1825 originally included only the segment from Three Points Road eastward, which intersected with US 81 at the time. On January 18, 1960, the alignment of US 81 was altered to align with I-35. At this point, FM 1825 was extended south  to intersect with the new I-35 alignment, and Three Points Road between FM 1825 and I-35 was added as an unsigned spur. On June 27, 1995, FM 1825 was redesignated as Urban Road 1825 (UR 1825). The designation reverted to FM 1825 with the elimination of the Urban Road system on November 15, 2018.

RM 1826

RM 1826 begins at an intersection with RM 150 just north of Driftwood. The route proceeds northeast , entering Travis County to intersect the stub end of the southern segment of SH 45. It continues northeast  along the Austin city limits to its northern terminus, along US 290 west of its intersection with SH 71 in the Oak Hill neighborhood of Austin.

FM 1826 was designated on November 20, 1951, from US 290 southwestward to the Hays County line. The route was extended west  to FM 966 (now RM 150) near Driftwood on September 29, 1954; the same day also saw the designation changed from an FM to an RM.

Junction list

FM 1827

FM 1828

FM 1828 (1951)

The first use of the FM 1828 designation was on November 20, 1951, in Collin County, from SH 24 west of McKinney north  to a road intersection. FM 1828 was cancelled on May 20, 1955, and became a portion of FM 1461.

FM 1828 (1955)

The next use of the FM 1828 designation was on August 24, 1955, in San Jacinto County, from SH 150, 2 miles south of Coldspring, south  to a road intersection. FM 1828 was cancelled on December 17, 1956, and became a portion of FM 2025.

FM 1829

FM 1829 (1951)

The original FM 1829 was designated on November 20, 1951, from SH 10 in Pilot Point west  to a road intersection. FM 1829 was cancelled on December 17, 1952, and transferred to FM 455.

FM 1830

Farm to Market Road 1830 (FM 1830) is located in Denton County.

FM 1830 begins at an intersection with FM 407 in Argyle. The highway travels in a northern direction along the eastern edge of the town, leaving the city limits at an intersection with Hickory Hill Road. FM 1830 travels through areas that feature a mix between subdivisions and farm land, entering Denton near Ryan Road. The highway travels through less developed areas of the city, ending at an intersection with US 377.

The highway was extended  southward to FM 1078 at Bartonville on December 17, 1952. The route was redesignated Urban Road 1830 (UR 1830) on June 27, 1995. The designation reverted to FM 1830 with the elimination of the Urban Road system on November 15, 2018.

FM 1831

RM 1832

Ranch to Market Road 1832 (RM 1832) is located in Jeff Davis County.

On March 26, 1953, Farm to Market Road 1832 (FM 1832) was designated along the present route. The route was to be cancelled and given to Jeff Davis County upon the completion of construction, which occurred by September 20, 1954. On September 20, 1955, the designation was restored. The road was redesignated RM 1832 on October 27, 1959.

FM 1832 (1951)

On December 17, 1952, FM  1832 was extended to US 380 near Moran. FM  1832 was cancelled on January 28, 1953, and became an extension of FM 880.

FM 1833

FM 1833 (1951)

FM 1833 was cancelled on October 28, 1953, and transferred to FM 1085.

FM 1834

FM 1834 (1951)

FM 1834 was cancelled on October 22, 1962, and transferred to FM 600.

FM 1835

FM 1836

RM 1837

Ranch to Market Road 1837 (RM 1837) is located in Jeff Davis County.

On March 26, 1953, the route number was assigned to the present route in Jeff Davis County, and was to be cancelled and relinquished back to county administration upon completion. Because the route was completed by September 20, 1954, the route was cancelled and relinquished back to county administration that day. On September 20, 1955, the state again assumed control over the road's maintenance, and the road was again designated as FM 1837. The road was given its current ranch to market designation on October 1, 1959.

FM 1837 (1951)

On November 20, 1951, Farm to Market Road 1837 (FM 1837) was originally designated as a  road in Kaufman County. That designation was canceled on January 29, 1953, when the original road was added as an extension to FM 429.

FM 1838

FM 1839

FM 1840

FM 1841

FM 1842

FM 1843

Farm to Market Road 1843 (FM 1843) is located in Lamb County. It runs from US 84 in Sudan east to FM 1055 north of Amherst.

FM 1843 was designated on November 20, 1951, along its current route.

FM 1844

Farm to Market Road 1844 (FM 1844) is located in Upshur and Gregg counties. It runs from US 271 in Union Grove east to US 259 near Judson. FM 1844 was designated on November 20, 1951, from US 271 in Union Grove to FM 1403 (now SH 300). On December 16 of that year, FM 1844 was extended to SH 26 (now US 259) at Judson. On November 5, 1971, it extended from old US 259 to new US 259.

Junction list

FM 1845

Farm to Market Road 1845 (FM 1845) is Upshur and Gregg counties. It runs from US 80 in Longview northwest to FM 726 near East Mountain. It is known as Pine Tree Road in Longview.

FM 1845 was designated on November 20, 1951, from FM 1844 south to the Gregg county line. On September 25, 1952, it extended south to SH 26 (later US 259; this section now part of SH 31). On July 28, 1953, FM 1845 was extended to SH 149, replacing FM 1919 on that route. On November 3, 1969, it extended south over the old location of SH 149 to Interstate Highway 20 (I-20). On October 26, 1983, it extended northwest  to East Mountain. On February 26, 1986, FM 1845 was extended northwest to FM 726. On March 25, 1992, the section from US 80 to I-20 was transferred to Loop 281. On June 27, 1995, the section from FM 2275 to US 80 was redesignated Urban Road 1845 (UR 1845). The designation of this section reverted to FM 1845 with the elimination of the Urban Road system on November 15, 2018.

Junction list

FM 1846

FM 1847

Farm to Market Road 1847 (FM 1847) is located in Cameron County. FM 1847 was originally designated on November 20, 1951, from a road intersection southward  to SH 100 in Los Fresnos, Texas. On October 26, 1954, this section of FM 732 became part of FM 510 which had extended west. On June 28, 1963, it was extended another  northward to FM 2358, with another extension northward to Arroyo Colorado on November 10, 1967, replacing part of FM 2358, which was canceled as the remainder west to FM 803 became part of FM 106 as several farm to market roads in the area were changed. The road at the north end would become part of FM 2925 (which ended there) on November 3, 1972. FM 2925 was extended east from FM 1847 on May 7, 1974, so the roads were no longer end to end. The portion south of FM 3248 was transferred to Urban Road 1847 (UR 1847) on June 27, 1995. The designation of this section reverted to FM 1847 with the elimination of the Urban Road system on November 15, 2018.

FM 1848

FM 1848 (1951)

The original FM 1848 was designated on November 20, 1951, from FM 1038 south to Sneedville. FM 1848 was cancelled on September 14, 1963, and transferred to FM 1168.

FM 1849

FM 1850

FM 1851

FM 1852

FM 1853

FM 1854

RM 1855

FM 1855

FM 1856

FM 1857

FM 1857 (1951)

The first use of the FM 1857 designation was in Howard County, from US 87 northwest of Big Spring northeast to FM 1584 at Vealmoor. FM 1857 was cancelled by January 18, 1952, and transferred to FM 669.

FM 1857 (1952)

The next use of the FM 1857 designation was in Glasscock County, from SH 158, 4 miles east of the Midland County line, northwest  to a road intersection. On August 20, 1952, the road was extended northwest to FM 307. FM 1857 was cancelled in September 1952 and transferred to FM 1800 (now SH 137).

FM 1858

FM 1858 (1951)

The original FM 1858 was designated on November 20, 1951, from SH 159, 3 miles east of Nelsonville, southwest  to a road intersection. On December 17, 1952, the road was extended southwest  to FM 1094. FM 1858 was cancelled on April 24, 1953, and eliminated from the highway system in exchange for extending FM 1371 from the Washington/Austin county line to FM 1456, extending FM 332 from FM 109 in Welcome to the end of FM 1263 the Washington/Austin county line, and the creation of FM 1952 (which then had its south end at the Austin-Fort Bend county line).

FM 1859

FM 1860

FM 1861

FM 1862

FM 1863

Farm to Market Road 1863 (FM 1863) is a  route located primarily in Comal County. FM 1863 begins in Bulverde, at an interchange with US 281, and travels east through the southern portion of the city. Due to the manner in which the route was constructed, the route briefly enters Bexar County before returning to Comal County. It has an intersection with FM 3009 near the Bulverde city limits. It continues eastward, eventually entering New Braunfels and ending at a junction with SH 46.

The designation was extended to the west  on October 13, 1954. On November 21, 1956, the route was extended northwest , and then extended westward to US 281 on October 31, 1957.

FM 1863 (1951)

The original FM 1863 was designated on November 20, 1951, from SH 21 near Chireno north  via Attoyac to a road intersection. FM 1863 was cancelled on December 17, 1952, and transferred to FM 1274 (which became part of FM 95 in 1964; FM 1274 was reused on a different route elsewhere in the state).

FM 1864

RM 1865

Ranch to Market Road 1865 (RM 1865) is located in Terrell and Val Verde counties. Its southern terminus is at US 90 in Terrell County, just east of the Val Verde County line. The route enters Val Verde County and travels to the northeast before ending at the Union Pacific Railroad line in Pumpville.

The route was designated as Farm to Market Road 1865 (FM 1865) on November 21, 1951, along the current route. On October 17, 1959, the designation was changed to RM 1865.

FM 1866

FM 1867

FM 1868

RM 1869

Ranch to Market Road 1869 (RM 1869) is located in Burnet and Williamson counties. It begins in Burnet County at an intersection with RM 1174 south of Bertram, within the Balcones Canyonlands National Wildlife Refuge. The route travels east into Williamson County, crossing SH 29 in Liberty Hill, before turning to the northeast and ending at a junction with US 183.

RM 1869 was designated on November 20, 1951, as Farm to Market Road 1869 (FM 1869), from SH 29 at Liberty Hill northeast  to SH 74 (now US 183). The designation was changed to RM 1869 on October 1, 1956. On November 21, 1956, the road was extended west  to what is now RM 1174.

Junction list

FM 1870

FM 1870 (1951)

The original FM 1870 was designated on November 20, 1951, from SH 71, 1.3 miles north of Smithville, towards Winchester to a point . On October 28, 1953, the road was extended east  to the Fayette County line. FM 1870 was cancelled on November 13, 1953, and transferred to FM 153.

RM 1871

 This was originally FM 1871.

FM 1872

FM 1873

FM 1874

FM 1874 (1951)

The original FM 1874 was designated on November 20, 1951, from FM 422, 1 mile west of England, south to SH 199 (now SH 114). FM 1874 was cancelled on October 18, 1954, and became a portion of FM 1790.

FM 1875

Farm to Market Road 1875 (FM 1875) is located in Fort Bend County. The two-lane highway begins at Loop 540 southwest of Beasley and heads generally northwest to US 90 Alternate at a location east of Tavener.

FM 1875 begins at a stop sign on Loop 540 southwest of Beasley. In this stretch, the road passes Ward Airpark on the right at Kovar Road. At Drachenberg Road, FM 1875 curves briefly to the northeast for  before swinging back to the northwest again. North of Drachenberg Road, FM 1875 is also known as Beasley Road.

On April 14, 1980, a  section of US 59 near Beasley became Loop 540.

FM 1876

Farm to Market Road 1876 (FM 1876) is located in Harris and Fort Bend counties. It runs from Bellaire Boulevard south to US 90A.

FM 1876 was designated on November 20, 1951, from US 59 (now US 90A) near Sugarland northward  to the Harris County line. On November 24, 1959, the road was relocated in Harris County, shortening the route by 2 miles. On September 25, 1962, the section in Harris County was cancelled, bringing the route back to its 1951 configuration. On May 25, 1976, the road was extended north  into Harris County to the intersection of Synott Road and Bellaire Boulevard. The entire route was transferred to UR 1876 on June 27, 1995, but was changed back to FM 1876 on November 15, 2018.

FM 1877

FM 1878

FM 1879

FM 1880

FM 1881

FM 1881 (1951)

The original FM 1881 was designated on November 20, 1951, from SH 24 (later SH 114, now SH 101) at Chico east  to a road intersection. On December 17, 1952, the road was extended north  to US 81 at Alvord. FM 1881 was cancelled on February 6, 1953, and transferred to FM 1655.

FM 1882

FM 1882 (1951–1953)

The first use of the FM 1882 designation was in Wise County, from SH 24 (now US 380) in Decatur south  to a road intersection. On December 17, 1952, the road was extended south  to SH 114 in Boyd. FM 1882 was cancelled on February 6, 1953, and transferred to FM 730.

FM 1882 (1953)

The next use of the FM 1882 designation was in Ellis County, from US 77 in Milford southeast to the Hill County line. Seven months later FM 1882 was cancelled to FM 308.

FM 1883

Farm to Market Road 1883 (FM 1883) is located in south central Clay County, with a spur connection to the unincorporated community of Deer Creek.

FM 1883 begins at an intersection with FM 172 and runs south. It then runs to the east, passing Deer Creek, before ending at SH 148. The roadway continues to the east as Lower Slobovia Road.

FM 1883 was designated on November 20, 1951, from FM 172 southwest to Deer Creek, replacing a former segment of that route. On April 29, 1952, FM 1883 was rerouted to end at SH 148. The western end was realigned on November 24, 1959, with the previous route becoming the spur connection to Deer Creek.

FM 1884

FM 1885

FM 1886

FM 1887

FM 1888
Farm to Market Road 1888 (FM 1888) is a designation that has been used three times. No highway currently uses the FM 1888 designation.

FM 1888 (1951)

The highway was extended  to US 90 in Hondo a month later on December 18. FM 1888 was cancelled and transferred to FM 462 on May 25, 1953.

FM 1888 (1953)

The highway was cancelled and transferred to FM 1373 in 1956.

FM 1888 (1958)

The highway was extended  to SH 171 in Hubbard on November 24, 1959. FM 1888 was deleted on July 24, 1963, with the mileage being transferred to FM 2114.

RM 1888

Ranch to Market Road 1888 (RM 1888) is in Blanco, Kendall and Gillespie counties. It runs from RM 1623 westward to RM 1376.

RM 1888 was designated on May 6, 1964, from RM 1623, 5 miles west of Blanco, westward . On June 1, 1965, RM 1888 was extended west to RM 1376.

FM 1889

FM 1890

FM 1891

Farm to Market Road 1891 (FM 1891) runs  from US 90 Alternate north then west to Texas State Highway 95 (SH 95).

FM 1892

Farm to Market Road 1892 (FM 1892) runs  from east of Frankston north, then east, to a boat ramp just west of the dam at Lake Palestine, near the headquarters of the Upper Neches River Municipal Water Authority which owns and operates the lake.

FM 1892 (1951–1952)

The first use of the FM 1892 designation was in Atascosa County, from US 281, 1.8 miles south of the Bexar County line, eastward  to a county road. FM 1892 was cancelled on December 17, 1952, and transferred to FM 536.

FM 1892 (1952–1960)

The next use of the FM 1892 designation was in Kendall County, from FM 473 (now RM 473) at Sisterdale south  toward Boerne. On November 21, 1956, the road was extended north . On September 27, 1960, the road was extended north  to the Gillespie county line. FM 1892 was cancelled on October 18, 1960, and transferred to RM 1376.

FM 1893

FM 1894

FM 1895

FM 1895 (1951)

The original FM 1895 was designated on November 20, 1951, from US 81 at Millet southeast  towards Los Angeles. FM 1895 was cancelled on January 29, 1953, and transferred to FM 469.

FM 1896

FM 1897

FM 1898

FM 1898 (1951)

The original FM 1898 was designated on December 18, 1951, from SH 10 (now US 377) at Collinsville east and south  to Ethel. FM 1898 was cancelled on October 28, 1953, and transferred to FM 902.

FM 1899

FM 1899 (1951)

The first use of the FM 1899 designation was in Hartley County, from FM 1712, east  to a road intersection. On December 1, 1953, the road was extended east  to the Moore county line. FM 1899 was cancelled on December 7, 1953, and transferred to FM 281.

FM 1899 (1953)

FM 1899 was cancelled on September 2, 1955, and transferred to FM 1235.

Notes

References

+18
Farm to market roads 1800
Farm to Market Roads 1800